The 2018 Liga 3 Central Java is the third edition of Liga 3 (formerly known as Liga Nusantara) Central Java as a qualifying round for the national round of 2018 Liga 3. Persik Kendal (now in 2018 Liga 2), winner of the 2017 Liga 3 Central Java are the defending champions. The competition began on 25 March 2018.

Format
In this competition, 17 teams are divided into 4 groups of four or five. The two best teams are through to knockout stage. The winner will represent Central Java in the national round of 2018 Liga 3.

Teams
There are 17 clubs which will participate the league in this season.

Group stage
This stage started on 25 March 2018.

Group A

Group B

Group C

Group D

Knockout stage

References

2018 in Indonesian football
Sport in Central Java